Through the Shelter of Love is a 1994 bronze sculpture by Jane DeDecker, installed in Salt Lake City, Utah, United States. The artwork depicts a family of six (including one man, one woman, and four children) playing the game London Bridge.

References

External links

 Through the Shelter of Love - Salt Lake City, UT at Waymarking

1994 sculptures
Bronze sculptures in Utah
Outdoor sculptures in Salt Lake City
Sculptures of children in the United States
Sculptures of men in Utah
Sculptures of women in Utah
Statues in Utah